Whelliton Augusto Silva, known as Whelliton (born 23 July 1972) is a Brazilian former professional footballer.

Honours
Boavista
Primeira Liga: 2000–01

References

External links
 

1972 births
Sportspeople from Santos, São Paulo
Living people
Brazilian footballers
Santos FC players
Vila Nova Futebol Clube players
Anápolis Futebol Clube players
Sport Club Corinthians Alagoano players
Boavista F.C. players
Brazilian expatriate footballers
Expatriate footballers in Portugal
Primeira Liga players
Córdoba CF players
Expatriate footballers in Spain
S.C. Beira-Mar players
CR Flamengo footballers
Associação Portuguesa de Desportos players
Clube de Regatas Brasil players
Association football forwards